Kejriwal is a surname. Notable people with the surname include:

 Anurag Kejriwal, Indian politician
 Arvind Kejriwal (born 1968), Indian politician

Indian surnames